Ayşegül Baybars Kadri (born 1981) is a Turkish-Cypriot politician, who has served as Interior Minister for Northern Cyprus since 2 February 2018.

Career 
In 2002 Baybars graduated with a degree in Law from Marmara University. She subsequently studied for a MA in European Law at the same institution. The lawyer was a founding member in 2016 of the Halkın Partisi (People's Party) established. Baybars was appointed Interior Minister on 2 February 2018.  She has been the youngest member of the Northern Cyprus coalition government. She resigned from the People's Party in 2022, alongside Jale Refik Rogers and 64 other party members. The same year, Baybars' financial assets were frozen, following allegations of financial misdemeanours.

Personal life 
Baybars is married and has one child.

References 

1981 births
Living people
Members of the Assembly of the Republic (Northern Cyprus)
Turkish Cypriot women in politics
Marmara University alumni